Statistics of Czechoslovak First League in the 1950 season.

Overview
It was contested by 14 teams, and NV Bratislava won the championship. Josef Bican was the league's top scorer with 22 goals.

Stadia and locations

League standings

Results

Top goalscorers

References

Czechoslovakia - List of final tables (RSSSF)

Czechoslovak First League seasons
Czech
Czech
1
1